Cibyra thisbe is a species of moth of the family Hepialidae. It is known from Colombia.

References

External links
Hepialidae genera

Hepialidae
Endemic fauna of Colombia
Lepidoptera of Colombia
Moths of South America
Moths described in 1901